Alexander Schubert (born 13 July 1979) is a German composer. Much of his music is experimental, involving multimedia, improvisatory, and interactive elements. He draws upon free jazz, techno, and pop styles.

Biography
Alexander Schubert was born in Bremen. He studied Bioinformatics in Leipzig, then spent a year at the Center for Art and Media Technology in Karlsruhe at the Institute of Music and Acoustics. He received a doctorate in multimedia composition at the Hochschule für Musik und Theater Hamburg, studying under Georg Hajdu and Manfred Stahnke. He teaches at the Musikhochschule Hamburg, directs the electronic studio at Musikhochschule Lübeck and has been a visiting lecturer at Darmstadt International Summer Courses. A founding member of ensembles Decoder, Trnn, Schubert-Kettlitz-Schwerdt, and Ember, he has also pursued an experimental pop music solo project under the name Sinebag.

Schubert's pieces have been performed at several international institutions, including Wien Modern, ICMC, SMC, Ultima Oslo Contemporary Music Festival, DLF Forum neuer Musik, IRCAM, ZKM Center for Art and Media Karlsruhe, Huddersfield Contemporary Music Festival, and Blurred Edges in Hamburg.

Music

Jennifer Walshe, Matthew Shlomowitz and Zubin Kanga have situated Schubert within what Walshe terms "The New Discipline" of contemporary music, alongside such composers as James Saunders and François Sarhan. Shlomowitz writes,

Schubert's music makes extensive use of multimedia, including live video, internet-sourced content, lighting, and motion sensors. Praised by some commentators for its fusion of avant-garde and pop styles, immersive qualities, and distinctive engagement with the internet, Schubert's critics have found his work excessively confrontational or conceptual.

Accolades
In 2009, Schubert won the Bourges Residency Prize, and his piece Nachtschatten (Nightshade) placed in the Canadian Electroacoustic Community "Jeu de temps" competition. He won the European Conference of Promoters of New Music competition in 2012 and a Giga-Hertz Production Award in 2013. Wiki-Piano.Net received an honorary mention in the 2019 Prix Ars Electronica.

Writings
Schubert has published articles on virtuality, post-digitality and multimedia composition. A collection of texts can be found in his book Switching Worlds.

Compositions

Pieces with live electronics and visuals
Coryllus Avellana (2007), for 49-channel tape, clarinet and electronics (named after Corylus avellana, common hazel)
Bifurcation Fury (2012), for electric bass guitar, live electronics and lighting
Lucky Dip (2013), for midi-drumkit, keyboard, and electric guitar
Sensate Focus (2014), for electric guitar, bass clarinet, violin, percussion, live electronics and animated light
HELLO (2014), for any number of instruments, live-electronics, and video
Supramodal Parser (2015), four pieces for singer, electric guitar, saxophone, percussion, piano and electronics (with haze and lighting)
Star Me Kitten (2015), for singer, flexible ensemble, video, and electronics
SCANNERS (2013, rev. 2016), for string quintet, choreography and electronics
f1 (2016), for variable group of musicians and video
Codec Error (2017), for double bass, two percussionists and lighting

Interactive sensor pieces
Laplace Tiger (2009), for drum kit, arm-sensor, live electronics and live video
Weapon of Choice (2009), for violin, sensor, live electronics and live video
Bureau Del Sol (2011), for drumkit, saxophone/piano/e-guitar/clarinet and timecode-vinyl
Your Fox's A Dirty Gold (2011), for solo performer with voice, motion sensors, electric guitar and live electronics
Point Ones (2012), for small ensemble and augmented conductor
Serious Smile (2014), for sensor-equipped ensemble (piano, percussion, cello, conductor) and live electronics

Instrumental pieces with live electronics
Sugar, Maths and Whips (2011), for violin, double bass, piano, drum kit, and electronics
Bird Snapper (2012), for singer, saxophone, e-bass, e-guitar, percussion, and keyboard
Grinder (2015), for saxophone, percussion, keyboard, e-guitar, and electronics
Wavelet A (2017), for 4 electric guitars and electronics
Black Out BRD (2017), for any combination of instruments

Superimpose cycle
Superimpose I (2009), for jazz quartet and electronics
Superimpose II – Night of the Living Dead (2009), for jazz quartet and electronics
Superimpose III – Infinite Jest: (2010), for e-guitar, drum kit, saxophone, and live electronics

Community pieces
Public Domain (2017), for one or more performers and/or electronics and/or video
Silent Post (2018), for any number of instruments and/or electronics and/or video
Black Out Software (2018), for any combination of instruments
Wiki-Piano.Net (2018), for piano and internet
Behind the Scenes (2019), for any combination of instruments

Tape pieces
Nachtschatten (2008)
Semaphores (2011)
Mimicry (2015)
The Password Disco (2017)

Installations
A Set of Dots (2007), interactive audiovisual installation
Some forgotten patterns (2009), audiovisual installation
Unit Cycle (2013), audiovisual installation
Solid State (2016), sound- and light-installation
Black Mirror (2016), hour-long participatory concert installation
Control (2018), 90-minute participatory concert installation
A Perfect Circle (2019), participatory "therapy session" for audience, 2 speakers, 2 assistants, and supervisor
Unity Swtich (2019), interactive virtual performance installation

Video pieces
It Was not an Easy Situation (2018), video and sound
Acceptance (2018), documentary piece for solo performer

Select discography

CD
2005: Milchwolken in Teein (Ahornfelder: AH01) as Sinebag.
2005: Près de la lisière (Ahornfelder: AH02) as Sinebag.
2006: Oullh d'baham (Euphorium: EUPH 010) with Urs Leimgruber, Christian Lillinger and Oliver Schwerdt.
2010: Aurona Arona (Creative Sources/Abhornfelder: AH18) with Urs Leimgruber, Christian Lillinger and Oliver Schwerdt.
2011: plays Sinebag (Ahornfelder: AH16, 2011).

DVD
2008: Live Scenes (Euphorium Films: EUPH 011) with Urs Leimgruber, Christian Lillinger and Oliver Schwerdt.
2011:Weapon of Choice (Ahornfelder: AH21).

References

Further reading

English
Kanga, Zubin and Alexander Schubert. "Flaws in the Body and How We Work with Them: An Interview with Composer Alexander Schubert." Contemporary Music Review 35, no. 4/5 (2016): pp. 535–553.
Thorpe Buchanan, Jason. Behavior and Compositional Process in Georges Aperghis’ Luna Park  (2019), pp. 68–70 (discussion of Star Me Kitten).

German
Hurt, Leopold. "Zwischen Hardcore und Software: Ein Porträt des Komponisten Alexander Schubert", Positionen, 102, 2015, pp. 31-33.
Nonnenmann, Rainer. "Der Mensch denkt, die Machine lenkt: ein Porträt des Komponisten Alexander Schubert", no. 153, May 2017, pp. 33-42.
Schubert, Alexander and Hanno Ehrler. "Verbindung von Körper und Klang: Alexander Schubert im Gespräch", MusikTexte, no. 153, May 2017, pp. 43-45.
Schubert, Alexander. "Binäre Komposition", MusikTexte, no. 153, May 2017, pp. 46-50.

External links
 
 
 Interactive score for Wiki-Piano.net

German male composers
21st-century German composers
German performance artists
1979 births
German experimental musicians
German electronic musicians
Living people
21st-century German male musicians